Francesco Maria Federico Carafa, C.R.  (1656–1737) was a Roman Catholic prelate who served as Bishop of Nola (1704–1737) and Bishop of San Marco (1694–1704).

Biography
Francesco Maria Federico Carafa was born in Rio Nero, Italy on 3 August 1656 and ordained a priest in the Congregation of Clerics Regular of the Divine Providence on 22 Jul 1679.
On 25 January 1694, he was appointed during the papacy of Pope Innocent XI as Bishop of San Marco.
On 31 January 1694, he was consecrated bishop by Pier Matteo Petrucci, Cardinal-Priest of San Marcello, with Giovanni Battista Visconti Aicardi, Bishop of Novara, and Gennaro Crespino, Bishop of Minori, serving as co-consecrators. 
On 7 April 1704, he was appointed during the papacy of Pope Clement XI as Bishop of Nola.
He served as Bishop of Nola until his death on 6 January 1737.

While bishop, he was the principal co-consecrator of Erasmus Bertone, Titular Bishop of Eumenia (1730).

References

External links and additional sources
 (for Chronology of Bishops) 
 (for Chronology of Bishops) 
 (for Chronology of Bishops) 
 (for Chronology of Bishops) 

17th-century Italian Roman Catholic bishops
18th-century Italian Roman Catholic bishops
Bishops appointed by Pope Innocent XI
Bishops appointed by Pope Clement XI
1656 births
1737 deaths